Hoài Đức is a rural district (huyện) of Hanoi in the Red River Delta region of Vietnam.

Geography 
Hoài Đức district is bordered by the urban districts of Bắc Từ Liêm and Nam Từ Liêm to the east, the districts of Quốc Oai and Phúc Thọ to the west, Hà Đông district to the south and Đan Phượng district to the north.

Divisions 
The is subdivided to 20 commune-level subdivisions, including the township of Trạm Trôi (district capital) and the rural communes of: An Khánh, An Thượng, Cát Quế, Di Trạch, Dương Liễu, Đắc Sở, Đông La, Đức Giang, Đức Thượng, Kim Chung, La Phù, Lại Yên, Minh Khai, Song Phương, Sơn Đồng, Tiền Yên, Vân Canh, Vân Côn, Yên Sở.

Districts of Hanoi